The Embassy of China in Moscow is the chief diplomatic mission of China in the Russian Federation. It is located at 6 Druzhby Street in the Ramenki District of Moscow.

See also 
 List of ambassadors of China to Russia
 China–Russia relations
 Diplomatic missions in Russia
 List of diplomatic missions of China

References

External links 
  Embassy of China in Moscow

China–Russia relations
China
Moscow
China–Soviet Union relations